Fall for You may refer to:
 "Fall for You" (Secondhand Serenade song), 2008
 "Fall for You" (The Whitlams song), 2002
 Fall for You (album), a 2014 album by Leela James and the title song from the album

See also
 Fallen For You (foaled 2009), a British Thoroughbred racehorse and broodmare
 Falling for You (disambiguation)
 Fallin' for You (disambiguation)